The Church of St John the Baptist is a church in North Luffenham, Rutland. It is Grade I listed.

History

The church dates to the 11th century. In the 13th and 14th centuries the north aisle was built and later, the south aisle. The tower, which has an unusual stair turret, was also built at this time.

The chancel was built in the early 14th century and has a double sedilia, which contains a plaque commemorating Archdeacon Robert Johnson, who founded Oakham and Uppingham Schools.  Johnson was Rector of North Luffenham for 51 years, from 1574 until his death.

The font dates to the 14th century and is octagonal.

The former Lord of the Manor of North Luffenham, John Digby, gifted a brass chandelier to the church which can still be seen.

A wall memorial to Susanna Noel was damaged during the 1643 sack of North Luffenham by Parliamentary troops under  Lord Grey.

The churchyard contains 31 graves maintained by the Commonwealth War Graves Commission. These include 11 Canadian servicemen who died while RAF North Luffenham was a RCAF base in the 1950s.

The remains of Luffenham House stands to the east of the church.

References

North Luffenham
North Luffenham